Beit HaShita (lit. House of the Acacia) is a kibbutz in northern Israel. Located between Afula and Beit She'an, it falls under the jurisdiction of Gilboa Regional Council.

Geography
The built-up area of Beit Hashita ranges from 70 meters below sea level to sea level.

History

Ottoman era
During the Ottoman era, a village named Shutta was located at the site of the kibbutz.  It has been suggested that Shutta was marked on the map Pierre Jacotin compiled in 1799, misnamed as Naim.

While travelling in the region in  1838,  Edward Robinson noted Shutta  as a village in the general area of Tamra, while  during his travels in  1852 he  noted it  as being a village north of the Jalud.

When Victor Guérin visited in 1870, he found here "a good many silos cut in the ground and serving as underground granaries to the families of the village", and "The women have to go for water to the canal of 'Ain Jalud  - marked on the map as the Wady Jalud."

In 1881, the Palestine Exploration Fund's Survey of Western Palestine described Shutta as a small adobe village on rising ground, surrounded by hedges of prickly pear and plough-land.

British Mandate era
In the 1922 census of Palestine, Shutta had a population of 280; 277 Muslims and 3 Orthodox Christians, decreasing in the 1931 census to 255; 2 Jews, 3 Christians and  250 Muslims, in a total of 85  houses.

The kibbutz traces its origin to a group meeting held in Hadera in 1928, by "Kvuzat HaHugim" of the HaMahanot HaOlim movement from Haifa and Jerusalem. The first members lived at nearby Ein Harod until 1934, when establishment of the kibbutz began at its present location about 1 km east of the village of Shatta.

The land of the kibbutz, part of the village land of Shutta including the village itself, was purchased by the Palestine Land Development Company from its Arab owners in 1931. The tenants contested the purchase, claiming to be the rightful owners, but the Beisan Civil Court ruled against them. The fate of the tenants and workers, numbering more than 200, became a matter of dispute between the government, the sellers, and the buyers. The Jewish Agency maintained that the terms of sale were for the land to be delivered free of residents, while the main seller Raja Ra'is apparently made use of loopholes in the law to provide the tenants with compensation below that to which they were entitled. The case led to a 1932 amendment of the law to better protect evicted tenants. In 2015, a grandchild of kibbutz residents, Jasmine Donahaye, published Losing Israel in which she expressed her disillusionment on learning of the eviction of Arabs on the founding of the kibbutz.

The kibbutz was later named after the biblical town Beit Hashita, where the Midianites fled after being beaten by Gideon (Judges 7:22), thought to be located where Shatta was. It falls under the jurisdiction of Gilboa Regional Council.

In  the 1945 statistics, Beit hash Shitta  had 590 inhabitants, all Jews. It was noted that Shatta was an alternative name.

Post-1948
In 1948, Beit HaShita  took over 5,400 dunams of land from the newly depopulated Arab villages of Yubla and Al-Murassas.

Eleven kibbutz members fell during the 1973 Yom Kippur War, the largest number as a percentage of the population than any other town in Israel.

Economy
Beit Hashita produced cotton, wheat, melons, olives and citrus fruits. There was also a dairy barn, chickens and a fish farm. In the 1960s, Beit HaShita established a pickling factory which produces and markets pickles, olives and pickled vegetables under the brand name Beit HaShita. The factory also produces syrups for making juices under the brand name Vitaminchick. The factory was bought from the kibbutz in 1998 by the Israeli food manufacturer, Osem.

Religion and culture
The Kibbutz Institute for Holidays and Jewish Culture, an organization that preserves the cultural heritage of the kibbutz, was established by kibbutz member Aryeh Ben-Gurion, nephew of Israeli Prime Minister David Ben-Gurion. Beit Hashita served as the basis for the 1981 English language book Kibbutz Makom, which described the kibbutz society. Many of the member families of the kibbutz are secular. There is however a small orthodox synagogue.

Archaeology
Ceramics and coins from the Byzantine era were found in the region of Beit Hashita.

Notable people
Yair Rosenblum  
Azaria Alon
Moshe Peled

References

Bibliography

External links 
Official website
Survey of Western Palestine, map 9:   IAA, Wikimedia commons
Kibbutz Beit HaShita Collection on the Digital collections of Younes and Soraya Nazarian Library, University of Haifa

Kibbutzim
Kibbutz Movement
Populated places established in 1935
Jewish villages in Mandatory Palestine
Populated places in Northern District (Israel)
1935 establishments in Mandatory Palestine